Mountain Township is an inactive township in McDonald County, in the U.S. state of Missouri.

Mountain Township was so named on account of its uneven terrain.

References

Townships in Missouri
Townships in McDonald County, Missouri